Ron Silliman (born August 5, 1946) is an American poet. He has written and edited over 30 books, and has had his poetry and criticism translated into 12 languages. He is often associated with language poetry. Between 1979 and 2004, Silliman wrote a single poem, The Alphabet. He has now begun writing a new poem, Universe, the first section of which appears to be called Revelator.

Life and work 
In the 1960s, Silliman attended Merritt College, San Francisco State University and the University of California, Berkeley, but left without attaining a degree. He lived in the San Francisco Bay area for more than 40 years.

As a published poet, he has taught in the Graduate Writing Program at San Francisco State University, at the University of California at San Diego, at New College of California and, in shorter stints, at Naropa University and Brown University.

Silliman has worked as a political organizer, a lobbyist, an ethnographer, a newspaper editor, a director of development, and as the executive editor of the Socialist Review (US). While in San Francisco, he served on numerous community boards, including the 1980 Census Oversight Committee, the Arson Task Force of the San Francisco Fire Department, and the State Department of Health's Task Force on Health Conditions in Locale Detention Facilities. Silliman worked as a market analyst in the computer industry before retiring at the end of 2011.

Silliman classifies his poetry as part of a lifework, which he calls Ketjak (the name refers to a form of Balinese dance drama based on an ancient text.) "Ketjak" is also the name of the first poem of The Age of Huts. If and when completed, the entire work will consist of The Age of Huts (1974–1980), Tjanting (1979–1981), The Alphabet (1979–2004), and Universe (2005-).

Marriage and family
In 1995 Silliman moved to Chester County, Pennsylvania, where he resides with his wife Krishna and two sons, Colin and Jesse.

Language poetry and critical writing 
Although he has come to be associated with the Language poets for most of his career, Silliman came of age under the sign of Donald Allen's New American Poetry (1960). Regarding the latter publication, he's said that it is:  Silliman was first published in Berkeley in 1965. In the 1960s he was published by journals associated with what he calls the School of Quietude, such as Poetry Northwest, TriQuarterly, Southern Review and Poetry. Silliman thought that such early acceptance was less a recognition of his skills than a lack of standards or rigor characteristic of that literary tendency; he began looking for alternatives. Some of these alternatives were initiated through various editing projects that he took part in, which gave him the opportunity to work with a wide range of poets. One of the more influential projects was Silliman's newsletter called Tottels (1970–81), that was one of the early venues for Language Poetry. He says that "The Dwelling Place," a feature article on nine poets published in Alcheringa (1975), was his "first attempt to write about language poetry".

In 1976 and 1977, he co-curated a reading series with Tom Mandel, at the Grand Piano, a coffee house. Nearly three decades later, some of the poets who took part in this series were still collaborating on a work based on these readings. This collaboration became part of what was called "an experiment in collective autobiography," co-authored by ten of these Language poets in San Francisco. When the project was completed, it consisted of 10 volumes in all. The other nine writers included were  Bob Perelman, Barrett Watten, Steve Benson, Carla Harryman, Tom Mandel, Kit Robinson, Lyn Hejinian, Rae Armantrout, and Ted Pearson. "[F]rom 1976 to 1979 the authors took part in a reading and performance series. The writing project, begun in 1998, was undertaken as an online collaboration, first via an interactive web site and later through a listserv."

Criticism
Silliman's mature critical writing dates to the early/mid-1970s. Asked to discuss the role of reference in poetry, he wrote the essay, "Disappearance of the Author, Appearance of the World," which was first published in the journal Art Con. Soon he edited a special issue of the magazine Margins, devoted to the work of the poet Clark Coolidge. He began to give talks and contribute essays on a regular basis thereafter.

He has said that he was influenced by the "New American Poetry", referring to the poets who were published in Donald Allen's groundbreaking anthology The New American Poetry 1945–1960. Today, these same figures have been long recognized.

In 1986, Silliman's anthology, In the American Tree, a collection of American language poetry, was published by the National Poetry Foundation.

He writes a weblog devoted to contemporary poetry and poetics.

Legacy and honors
In 2012, Silliman was one of three Kelly Writers House Fellows at the University of Pennsylvania, together with Karen Finley and John Barth. In 2010, he received the annual Levinson Prize from the Poetry Foundation.

Silliman was a 2003 Literary fellow of the National Endowment for the Arts and a 2002 Fellow of the Pennsylvania Arts Council, as well as a PEW Fellow in the Arts in 1998.

He is memorialized in the Addison Anthology, a sidewalk portion in Berkeley, California containing plaques honoring poets and authors. Silliman was voted the Poet Laureate of the Blogosphere

Bibliography 

Crow  (1971)
Mohawk (1973)
Nox  (1974)
Ketjak (San Francisco: This Press, 1978)
Sitting Up, Standing, Taking Steps  (1978)
Legend (1980, with Bruce Andrews, Charles Bernstein, Ray DiPalma, Steve McCaffery)
Tjanting  (1981; new edition from Salt Publishing, 2002)
BART  (1982)
ABC  (1983)
Paradise  (1985)
The Age of Huts  (1986)
In the American Tree: Language, Realism, Thought (National Poetry Foundation, 1986; second edition, 2001: anthology)
Lit (1987)
The New Sentence (1987, criticism)
What  (1988)
Manifest  (1990)
 
Demo to Ink  (1992)
Toner  (1992)
Jones (1993)
N/O (1994)
Xing (1996)
MultiPlex  (1998, with Karen Mac Cormack)
®  (1999)
Sunset Debris (ubu ebook, 2002), from The Age of Huts
2197 (ubu ebook, 2004,) from The Age of Huts
Woundwood  (2004)
Under Albany (Salt Publishing, 2004), memoir
The Chinese Notebook (2004, ubu ebook) from The Age of Huts
(contributor, to each of the 10 volumes)The Grand Piano: An Experiment In Collective Autobiography (with Bob Perelman, Barrett Watten, Steve Benson, Carla Harryman, Tom Mandel, Rae Armantrout, Kit Robinson, Lyn Hejinian, and Ted Pearson) (Mode A/This Press,)
The Age of Huts (University of California Press, 2007)
The Alphabet (University of Alabama Press, 2008)
Wharf Hypothesis (Lines Chapbooks, 2011) - chapbook, from Northern Soul
Revelator (2013) - the opening poem of a projected 360-poem sequence entitled Universe
Northern Soul (Shearsman Books, 2014)  - the second book of Universe.
Against Conceptual Poetry (Counterpath, 2014; criticism)

Critical studies and reviews of Silliman's work
Leningrad

References

External links 

EPC page
PennSound page
Poem by Silliman at Milk Magazine
Ron Silliman papers at UCSD
Ron Silliman on Poets.org Profile and poems. 
 Silliman profile at Modern American Poetry 
Silliman's Blog A weblog focused on contemporary poetry and poetics.
Silliman at UbuWEB, online books
Interview with The Argotist Online
"Torque" & The New Sentence Silliman discusses background & conception of his influential "manifesto" The New Sentence
“The New Sentence”: The original talk – given September 16, 1979 at the San Francisco Art Institute in Bob Perelman’s Talk Series
Ron Silliman, making poetry, unmaking rules review of The Age of Huts by Andrew Ervin, at philly.com, June 24, 2007
The Grand Piano website devoted to the 10 volumes of "Collective Autobiography" by 10 of the so-called "West Coast" group of Language poets, including Silliman, which began serial publication in November 2006.

1946 births
American male poets
American bloggers
Language poets
Living people
Writers from San Francisco
Pew Fellows in the Arts
Writers from Pasco, Washington
San Francisco State University alumni
San Francisco State University faculty
American male bloggers